Court of Final Appeal may refer to:
Court of Final Appeal (Hong Kong), the court with the final adjudication power on the laws of Hong Kong.
Court of Final Appeal (Macau), the court with the final adjudication power on the laws of Macau.
Court of Final Appeal Building, the court building

+